The New River Valley Roller Girls, often known as the NRV Roller Girls, is a women's flat track roller derby league based in Christiansburg, Virginia.  Founded in 2007, the league consists of two teams which compete against teams from other leagues. New River Valley is a member of the Women's Flat Track Derby Association (WFTDA).

History
The league was founded in February 2007 by a local woman known as "Speed Junkie".  Other early members included Kacey Huntington, known as "I. M. Pain", who later became a leading player with the Charm City Roller Girls.

NRV was accepted into the Women's Flat Track Derby Association Apprentice Program in July 2010, and became a full member of the WFTDA in December 2011.

WFTDA rankings

References

Montgomery County, Virginia
Roller derby leagues established in 2007
Roller derby leagues in Virginia
Women's Flat Track Derby Association Division 3
2007 establishments in Virginia